Mikael Wulff (born 2 September 1972) is a Danish comedian, who appeared in television shows such as Dolph og Wulff, and is co-illustrator of the Wulffmorgenthaler comic strips, which he produces together with Anders Morgenthaler.

References

1972 births
Danish cartoonists
Danish stand-up comedians
Living people